Argyrotaenia dichroaca is a species of moth of the family Tortricidae. It is found in Costa Rica and Mexico (Guerrero, Federal District).

References

Moths described in 1914
dichroaca
Moths of North America